The 1887 Cornell Big Red football team was an American football team that represented Cornell University during the 1887 college football season.  In the first season of intercollegiate football at Cornell, the team compiled a 0–2 record, losing games to Union College (10–24) and Lehigh University (10–38).

Schedule

References

Cornell
Cornell Big Red football seasons
College football winless seasons
Cornell Big Red football